Ballineen and Enniskean railway station was on the West Cork Railway in County Cork, Ireland.

History
Two stations, "Ballineen" and "Enniskeen," were built 1 mile apart and opened on 12 June 1866. They were both closed and merged on 15 May 1891 as "Ballineen and Enniskean"

Regular passenger services were withdrawn on 1 April 1961.

References

Further reading 
 

Disused railway stations in County Cork
Railway stations opened in 1891
Railway stations closed in 1961
1891 establishments in Ireland
Railway stations in the Republic of Ireland opened in the 19th century